Streethay is a village and former civil parish, now in the parish of Fradley and Streethay, in the Lichfield district, in the county of Staffordshire, England, adjoining the city of Lichfield, on the east side of the West Coast Main Line railway. In 2001 the parish had a population of 1111.

Village amenities
Streethay is a small village and has no shops. The main road in Streethay is the Old Burton Road (A5127 road), which starts at the A38 road junction and the road used to be the main route into Birmingham before the A38 was constructed. There was a former  public house called 'The Anchor' which has been converted into flats and business premises. There is a children's play park on the A5127 Burton Road. There is a bus service that stops in Streethay, which continues onto Lichfield and Burton Upon Trent, calling at the villages of Fradley and Alrewas.

Further up the A5127 road to Lichfield there is Lichfield Trent Valley railway station which is on the West Coast Mainline and has direct links to Birmingham, Northern England, Scotland, and London. The northern spur of phase 1 of HS2 rail line will run just east of the village, linking with the West Coast Main Line at Handsacre.

Plans for 750 new houses was granted in 2012 by Lichfield District Council and is now near completion in 2020. The estate is known as Roman Heights and Cathedral View. There is a community association which supports residents on the estate.

Streethay is less than one mile from the city of Lichfield.

History 
The name "Streethay" means 'Roman road enclosure'. Fradley was formerly a township in the parish of St. Michael, from 1866 Streethay was a civil parish in its own right, on 1 April 2009 the parish was abolished to form "Fradley and Streethay".

See also
Listed buildings in Fradley and Streethay

References

External links

 British History Online: Streethay with Fulfen.
 Staffordshire Online Gazetteer: Fisherwick and Streethay
https://www.rhcv.org.uk Roman Heights & Cathedral View Community Association

Villages in Staffordshire
Former civil parishes in Staffordshire
Lichfield District